Pratt's Mill is a  tower mill at Crowborough, Sussex, England which has been truncated and converted to residential accommodation.

History

Pratt's Mill was built between September 1861 and February 1862. The machinery from Calverley Mill, Tunbridge Wells was used in the construction of the mill. On 3 February 1862 the son of the miller was killed when he became entangled in the machinery. The mill was working by wind until 1907 and then by steam until 1922. Frank Brangwyn, RA painted the mill when it was without sails and fantail. The picture appears in an early book on windmills. In 1927 the mill was converted into residential accommodation, being reduced in height to three storeys.

Description

As built, Pratt's Mill was a five-storey brick tower mill clad in  peg tiles. It had four Patent sails and the Kentish-style cap was winded by a fantail. All that remains today is the lower three storeys of the tower, with various additions and extensions. Hemming states that the mill may have driven three pairs of millstones.

Millers

Richard Pratt 1861
Samuel Pratt 1881 - 1891

References for above:-

References

External links
Photograph of mill 1890
Postcard of mill 1905
Another postcard c.1905
Mill and pond 1912
Painting by Frank Brangwyn 1923

Further reading
 Online version

Tower mills in the United Kingdom
Grinding mills in the United Kingdom
Windmills completed in 1862
Towers completed in 1862
Windmills in East Sussex
1862 establishments in England
Crowborough